James John Block (born James John Blochowicz on March 13, 1885 – August 6, 1937) was a catcher over parts of five seasons in Major League Baseball. After his baseball career ended, he became a salesman for the Miller Brewing Company.

References

External links

1885 births
1937 deaths
Major League Baseball catchers
Baseball players from Wisconsin
Washington Senators (1901–1960) players
Chicago White Sox players
Chicago Whales players
People from Wisconsin Rapids, Wisconsin
Galveston Sand Crabs players
Corsicana Oilers players
Temple Boll Weevils players
Minneapolis Millers (baseball) players
Milwaukee Brewers (minor league) players
St. Joseph Drummers players